Robert Tyrwhit D.D. (1698 – 15 June 1742) was a Canon of Windsor from 1730 to 1742 and Archdeacon of London from 1731 to 1742.

Family

He was born in 1698 in Cammeringham, Lincolnshire. He married Elizabeth, daughter of Bishop Edmund Gibson of London.

Career

He was educated at Magdalene College, Cambridge, where he graduated BA in 1719, MA in 1722 and DD in 1728.

He was appointed:
Rector of Welton, Louth 1722
Chaplain to the King 1727 - 1742
Rector of All-Hallows-the-Great, London 1727 - 1737
Vicar of Kensington 1728 - 1731
Minister of St James's Church, Piccadilly 1729 - 1733
Archdeacon of London 1731 - 1742
Prebendary of Kentish Town in St Paul’s Cathedral 1732

He was appointed to the eighth stall in St George's Chapel, Windsor Castle in 1730, and held the stall until 1742.

Notes 

1698 births
1742 deaths
Canons of Windsor
Archdeacons of London
Alumni of Magdalene College, Cambridge